Amsterdam G's was a semi-professional ice hockey team in Amsterdam, Netherlands. It was founded in 2011 by 
the group that formerly operated the Amstel Tijgers before it ceased operations in 2010. The team played at the Jaap Edenhal. It participated in the Dutch Cup and the defunct Eredivise league. They were known in their first year of operations as the "Amsterdam Capitals", but changed names after finding a corporate sponsor in 2012. The team was coached by Ron Berteling.

North Sea Cup/Eredivisie results
Note: GP = Games played, W = Wins, OTW = Overtime Wins, OTL = Overtime Losses, L = Losses, GF = Goals for, GA = Goals against, Pts = Points

References

External links
 Team website (Dutch)

Ice hockey teams in the Netherlands
Ice hockey clubs established in 2011
Sports clubs in Amsterdam